Edward Lanzer Joseph was a journalist, playwright and novelist (born in London, England in 1792 and died in Trinidad in 1838) who emigrated to Trinidad in 1817. Joseph was of Anglo-Jewish descent.

He was the author of the novel Warner Arundell: The Adventures of a Creole, which was published in 1838. He also published another book, History of Trinidad, in 1838.

Joseph wrote, produced and translated plays while living in Trinidad that were performed in Port of Spain by a local amateur troupe known as the Brunswick Amateurs. In response to the annually recurring imposition of martial law from 1815 onwards by the Governor of Trinidad, Sir Ralph Woodford, Joseph wrote a musical farce in 1832 titled "Martial law in Trinidad; a musical farce in two acts.". It satirized the annual muster of  militia troops each Christmas to squash the possibility of a local slave rebellion. The play was notable for its realistic portrayal of the local dialects, such as Trinidadian Creole, and of the African and Creole ethnic groups on the island.

References

External links 
 Warner Arundell by E. L. Joseph full Open Access copy available in the Digital Library of the Caribbean

1792 births
English Jewish writers
People from London
Trinidad and Tobago novelists
1838 deaths
19th-century novelists
Trinidad and Tobago male writers
19th-century British male writers
Caribbean Jews